Jesús Héctor Gallego Herrera (died June 1971) was a Colombian Roman Catholic priest who was kidnapped and killed in Panama following his opposition to the Panamanian military ruler Omar Torrijos.

Life 
Gallego organized peasant cooperatives in Santa Fé District of Panama's Veraguas Province, where his work angered both landowners and officials of the ruling National Guard. He disappeared from Santa Fé on June 9, 1971.

Investigation and convictions 
On November 20, 1993, three soldiers were convicted of his abduction and murder. Eugenio Nelson Magallon, one of the three convicted, was convicted in absentia, as he had been a fugitive since the 1989 US invasion of Panama. The trial led to a national debate in Panama over the reputation of Torrijos, who was popularly seen by some as a benevolent dictator.

In December 2000, human remains were discovered at a Panamanian National Guard base, incorrectly believed to be Gallego's. President Mireya Moscoso appointed a Truth Commission to investigate the site and those at other bases. In 2002, the commission concluded that Gallego had been forcibly disappeared but that the remains were not his.

References

Bibliography 

1971 deaths
20th-century Colombian Roman Catholic priests
Panamanian activists
People murdered in Panama
Year of birth missing
20th-century Roman Catholic martyrs
Colombian people murdered abroad